"Entre Nosotros" is a song by Argentine rappers and singers Tiago PZK and Lit Killah. It was released on 8 July 2021 through Mad Move Records. This is the fourth song on which the two artists collaborate. The song reached #1 on the Billboard Argentina Hot 100 chart, being the third song by Tiago PZK to reach number 1 and the second by Lit Killah. The music video for the song reached 90 million views on YouTube in just one month. It is also the third single from Tiago PZK's upcoming debut studio album to be released in late 2021.

Background
The song was released as the third single from Tiago PZK's upcoming debut album. The song reached Spotify's Global Top 50 placing it on Spotify's most-played songs list. Although the song was released on 8 July 2021, it took weeks for the song to hit the charts thanks to the song trending on the short video platform TikTok.

Charts

Weekly and monthly

Certifications

Remix version

Days before the end of 2021, the artists Tiago PZK and Lit Killah announced on their social networks that the song would have a remix, the invited artists were confirmed days before the song was released, the remix would be accompanied by the Argentine rapper Nicki Nicole and Argentine singer María Becerra. The song was finally released on 5 January 2022 on Tiago PZK's YouTube channel through Warner Music Latin.

Charts

Certifications

References

External links
 Lyrics of this song at Genius

2021 singles
2021 songs
Argentina Hot 100 number-one singles